Lagasse or Lagassé is a surname. Notable people with the surname include:

Bob Lagassé, Canadian politician
Emeril Lagasse (born 1959), American celebrity chef
Jan Lagasse, American curler
Janet Lagasse, American tennis player
Jeannette Boudreault-Lagassé (born 1941), Canadian writer
Louis Lagassé (born 1947), Canadian businessman
Roger Lagassé (born 1957), candidate in 1989 New Democratic Party leadership election (Canada)
Scott Lagasse (born 1959), American racing driver
Scott Lagasse Jr. (born 1981), American racing driver
Tim Lagasse (born 1969), American puppeteer